Blue Sunshine is the only studio album by the British supergroup the Glove, released in 1983 by Wonderland Records/Polydor.  This album mainly served as a diversion for Robert Smith and Steven Severin when both of them were under heavy stress in their respective bands the Cure and Siouxsie and the Banshees. Since Smith was prohibited from singing in another band by his record company, he and Severin recruited Zoo dancer Jeanette Landray (a former girlfriend of Banshees drummer Budgie) to sing on the majority of the tracks; Smith contractually could only sing on two songs, "Mr. Alphabet Says" and "Perfect Murder". Other musicians involved in this project were drummer Andy Anderson (who had just joined the Cure), multi-instrumentalist Martin McCarrick (who later joined the Banshees), and string players Ginny Hewes and Anne Stephenson (the latter had played for the Banshees on the album A Kiss in the Dreamhouse).

Severin wrote the lyrics to all of the songs except "Like an Animal", "Sex-Eye-Make-Up", "Perfect Murder", which were written by Smith, and "Punish Me with Kisses", on which the two collaborated.

Two singles were taken from the album, "Like an Animal" and "Punish Me with Kisses".

In 2006, the album was digitally remastered and re-released by Rhino Records, featuring a bonus disc with Smith singing vocals on studio demo versions of all the songs instead of Landray.

In 2013, the album was re-released for Record Store Day by Polydor (in Europe) and Rhino (in the US) as a limited edition of 3,500 copies (numbered on the sleeve), pressed on marbled blue vinyl and featuring none of the 2006 bonus material.

Track listing

Personnel 
 All tracks: lyrics and music written, arranged, played by Steven Severin and Robert Smith.
Robert Smith - vocals, guitars, bass, keyboards
Steven Severin - bass, keyboards
Jeanette Landray - vocals
Andy Anderson - drums
Martin McCarrick - keyboards, strings
James SK Wān - electric kazoo
Ginny Hewes - strings
Anne Stephenson - strings

References

External links 
 All vinyl, cassette, CD versions

1983 debut albums
The Glove albums
Polydor Records albums
Rhino Records albums